Carl-Schultze-Theater was a theatre in St. Pauli, Hamburg, Germany.

Theatres in Hamburg
Buildings and structures in Hamburg-Mitte